The Avenue of the Stars or the Avenue of Stars may refer to:

Locations
Avenue of the Stars, Century City, an avenue in Century City, Los Angeles, California, United States of America
Avenue of Stars, Hong Kong, an avenue in Hong Kong honoring the Hong Kong film industry
Hong Kong Avenue of Comic Stars, an avenue in Hong Kong honoring Hong Kong comics
Avenue of the Stars, a street in Cedar Park, Texas where the Cedar Park Center is located
Avenue of the Stars, a street in Frisco, Texas where the Dr Pepper Arena is located
Avenue of Stars, London, a former exhibition in London, England

Other
Avenue of the Stars: 50 Years of ITV, a television special from 2005 to celebrate 50 years of ITV
List of halls and walks of fame